Everglades Radio Network was a network of travelers' information stations serving the Alligator Alley segment of Interstate 75 in the Everglades region of Florida. Owned by the Florida Department of Transportation and jointly programmed by the FDOT and the Florida Department of Environmental Protection, the network was based at Florida Gulf Coast University in Ft. Myers. It consisted of two low-power FM radio stations, WFLP-LP 98.7 FM, licensed to the Collier County Rest Area (near Mile Marker 63) and WFLU-LP 107.9 FM in Miles City (Exit 80, State Road 29). The coverage area of the two transmitters covered most of Alligator Alley within Collier County.

The FDOT surrendered the licenses for both stations to the Federal Communications Commission (FCC) on January 9, 2017; the availability of cellular and internet service was provided as the rationale for the service provided by the stations no longer being needed. The FCC cancelled the licenses for both stations on February 6, 2017.

Stations

References

External links
Everglades Radio Network
 
 

Florida Gulf Coast University
Interstate 75
2017 disestablishments in Florida
Radio stations established in 2003
Radio stations disestablished in 2017